Leonardo Reginatto (born April 10, 1990) is a Brazilian professional baseball third baseman for the Rieleros de Aguascalientes of the Mexican League. He represented Brazil at the 2013 World Baseball Classic.

Career

Tampa Bay Rays
On May 14, 2009, Reginatto signed with the Tampa Bay Rays organization at 19 years old as an international free agent. He made his professional debut with the VSL Rays. In 2010, Reginatto played for the Rookie-level Princeton Rays, slashing .279/.323/.344 with 4 RBI. The next year, he played for the Low-A Hudson Valley Renegades, posting a .198/.254/.251 slash line with 2 home runs and 17 RBI. Reginatto returned to Hudson Valley in 2012 and put up a far better .276/.329/.323 batting line with 1 home run and 29 RBI. In 2013, he played for the Single-A Bowling Green Hot Rods, slashing .325/.388/.393 with 1 home run and 49 RBI in 112 games. In 2014, Reginatto split the season between the High-A Charlotte Stone Crabs and the Double-A Montgomery Biscuits, accumulating a .292/.367/.340 slash line with 41 RBI. In 2015, Reginatto split the season between Montgomery and the Triple-A Durham Bulls, logging a .269/.323/.364 batting line with a career-high 3 home runs in 100 games. On November 6, 2015, he elected free agency.

Minnesota Twins
On December 18, 2015, Reginatto signed a minor league contract with the Minnesota Twins organization. For the 2016 season, Reginatto split the year between the Double-A Chattanooga Lookouts and the Triple-A Rochester Red Wings, batting a cumulative .265/.318/.327 with 2 home runs and 46 RBI. In 2017, he was invited to Spring Training but did not make the club and returned to Rochester and hit .303/.369/.390 with 3 home runs and 38 RBI. On November 6, 2017, he elected free agency. On December 8, Reginatto re-signed with Minnesota on a new minor league contract. In 2018, Reginatto again returned to Rochester, and batted .207/.255/.286 with 2 home runs and 21 RBI in 61 games. On November 2, 2018, he elected free agency.

Ottawa Champions
On March 6, 2019, Reginatto signed with the Ottawa Champions of the Can-Am League. In 92 games with Ottawa, Reginatto batted .300/.378/.332 with no home runs and 37 RBI. He became a free agent following the season.

West Virginia Power
On March 15, 2021, Reginatto signed with the West Virginia Power of the Atlantic League of Professional Baseball. Reginatto spent his tenure with the Power on the inactive list, and did not play in a game for the team before he was released on June 18, 2021.

Rieleros de Aguascalientes
On June 22, 2021, Reginatto signed with the Rieleros de Aguascalientes of the Mexican League.

Yaquis de Obregón
In September 2022, Reginatto signed with the Yaquis de Obregón of the Mexican Pacific League.

Venados de Mazatlán
In November 2022, Reginatto signed with the Venados de Mazatlán of the Mexican Pacific League.

References

External links

1990 births
Living people
Bowling Green Hot Rods players
Brazilian expatriate baseball players in Canada
Brazilian expatriate baseball players in the United States
Charlotte Stone Crabs players
Chattanooga Lookouts players
Durham Bulls players
Hudson Valley Renegades players
Montgomery Biscuits players
Ottawa Champions players
Princeton Rays players
Rochester Red Wings players
Sportspeople from Curitiba
Toros del Este players
Brazilian expatriate baseball players in the Dominican Republic
Venezuelan Summer League Rays players
2013 World Baseball Classic players
Brazilian expatriate baseball players in Venezuela
Brazilian expatriate baseball players in Mexico
Navegantes del Magallanes players
Bravos de Margarita players
Tiburones de La Guaira players
Rieleros de Aguascalientes players
Yaquis de Obregón players
Venados de Mazatlán players